Sainghin-en-Mélantois is a commune in the Nord department in northern France. It is part of the Métropole Européenne de Lille.

Heraldry

Economy 

Part of the Lesquin Regional Transport Center is located in the municipality, as is the Haute-Borne business park. The company Verisure opened a building there in 2014, employing about 300 people. A camping camp, the Grand Sart, operates in the commune.

See also
Communes of the Nord department

References

Communes of Nord (French department)
French Flanders